The Puerto Rico representative districts refers to the electoral districts in which Puerto Rico is divided for the purpose of electing 40 of the 51 members of the House of Representatives of Puerto Rico (with the other 11 being elected at-large). The island is currently divided into 40 representative districts, each based on a similar number of inhabitants, and comprising one or more precincts—an electoral division divided, in turn, into colleges.  A college usually is defined simply by the nearest public school to the voter's declared residence. American citizens (including Puerto Ricans) may vote only in the district in which they have declared their residence, and only for one candidate, for up to one member of the House per district by first-past-the-post. (As well, each voter may cast a vote for the election of an at-large member of the House of Representatives.)

History
Districts are revised after every ten-year census.

Districts

See also
Puerto Rico Senatorial districts

References

External links
Comision Estatal de Elecciones
Redistribución Distritos de Puerto Rico

House of Representatives of Puerto Rico